Duke Ellington Plays Mary Poppins is an album by American pianist, composer and bandleader Duke Ellington recorded in 1964 and released on the Reprise label in 1965. The album features recordings of tunes from the 1964 musical film Mary Poppins arranged by Ellington and Billy Strayhorn.

Reception
The Allmusic review by Scott Yanow awarded the album 3½ stars and stated: "This disc is a surprising success. Duke Ellington was somehow persuaded into revising and recording a dozen songs from the score of Walt Disney's Mary Poppins, and the results are actually quite memorable".

Track listing
All compositions by Richard M. Sherman and Robert B. Sherman
 "A Spoonful of Sugar" - 3:13  
 "Chim Chim Cher-ee" - 2:52  
 "Feed the Birds" - 3:42  
 "Let's Go Fly a Kite" - 2:31  
 "Stay Awake" - 2:28  
 "I Love to Laugh" - 2:29  
 "Jolly Holiday" - 3:04  
 "Sister Suffragette" - 3:05  
 "The Perfect Nanny" - 4:09  
 "Step in Time" - 2:46  
 "The Life I Lead" - 3:43  
 "Supercalifragilisticexpialidocious" - 2:27  
Recorded at Universal Studios, Chicago on September 6, 8 & 9, 1964.

Personnel
Duke Ellington – piano
Cat Anderson, Herb Jones, Cootie Williams, Nat Woodard - trumpet
Lawrence Brown, Buster Cooper - trombone
Chuck Connors - bass trombone
Jimmy Hamilton - clarinet, tenor saxophone
Johnny Hodges - alto saxophone
Russell Procope - alto saxophone, clarinet
Paul Gonsalves, Eddie Johnson - tenor saxophone
Harry Carney - baritone saxophone
John Lamb - bass 
Sam Woodyard - drums

References

Reprise Records albums
Duke Ellington albums
1965 albums
Mary Poppins